OBS Studio (also Open Broadcaster Software or OBS, for short) is a free, open-source, and cross-platform screencasting and streaming app. It is available for Windows, macOS, Linux distributions, and BSD. The OBS Project raises funds on the platforms Open Collective and Patreon.

Overview 
OBS Studio is a free and open-source app for screencasting and live streaming. Written in C/C++ and built with Qt, OBS Studio provides real-time capture, scene composition, recording, encoding, and broadcasting via Real Time Messaging Protocol (RTMP), HLS, SRT or RIST. It can stream videos to any RTMP-supporting destination, including YouTube, Twitch, Instagram and Facebook.

For video encoding, OBS Studio can use the x264 transcoder, Intel Quick Sync Video, Nvidia NVENC and the AMD Video Coding Engine to encode video streams into the H.264/MPEG-4 AVC or H.265/HEVC formats. It can encode multiple tracks of audio in the AAC format. More experienced users can choose any codecs and containers available in libavcodec and libavformat, or output the stream to a custom FFmpeg URL.

OBS Studio also supports plug-ins to extend its functionality.

User interface 

The main user interface is organized into five sections: scenes, sources, audio mixer, transitions, and controls. Scenes are groups of sources like live and recorded video, text and audio. The mixer panel lets the user mute the audio, and adjust the volume through virtual faders, and apply effects by pressing the cogwheel next to the mute button. The control panel has options for starting/stopping a stream or recording, a button to transform OBS to a more professional Studio Mode (see below), a button for opening the settings menu and a button to exit the program. The upper section has a live video preview, used to monitor and edit the current scene. The user interface can be switched to a variety of themes, including both dark and light themes, depending on what the user prefers.

When in Studio Mode, there are two canvas preview windows, the left one for modifying and preview of non-active scenes, while the right window is for preview of the live scene ("Preview" and "Program" respectively). In the middle there is a secondary transition button, allowing for transitioning to the non-active scene in the left window using user-defined "quick transitions".

History 
OBS Studio started out as a small project created by Hugh "Jim" Bailey, but quickly grew with the help of many online collaborators working both to improve OBS and to share knowledge about the program. The first version was released in August 2012. In 2013, development started on a rewritten version known as OBS Multiplatform (later renamed OBS Studio) for multi-platform support, a more thorough feature set, and a more powerful API. In 2016, OBS "Classic" lost support and OBS Studio became the primary version. In March 2022, OBS was released on Steam for both Windows and Mac.

On 16 December 2021, an OBS Studio developer drew attention to an invitation-only release of TikTok Live Studio, which appeared to be based on OBS Studio, without acknowledgement and in violation of OBS Studio's license.

See also 

Comparison of screencasting software
List of free and open-source software packages
Screencast

References

External links 
 
 

2012 software
C++ software
Cross-platform free software
Free and open-source software
Free software programmed in C++
Livestreaming software
Screencasting software
Software that uses FFmpeg
Software that uses Qt
Video recording software
Windows software